Leon Samuel Roudiez (1917-2004) was an American literary scholar and professor emeritus and former head of the French department at Columbia University.

Works
French Fiction Revisited
French Fiction Today: A New Direction
 Pouvoirs de l'horreur
 Powers of horror : an essay on abjection
 Revolution in poetic language
 Sēmeiōtichē : recherches pour une sémanalyse.
 Soleil noir
 Strangers to ourselves
 Tales of love

References

2004 deaths
1917 births
American literary critics
Columbia University faculty